State Route 1 (SR 1) is a former state highway in Ohio originally planned as a second Ohio Turnpike. Its southern terminus was in Cincinnati, and its northern terminus was in Conneaut at the Pennsylvania state line. The majority of its route is now Interstate 71.

History
After the original SR 1 was redesignated as US 40 in 1927, SR 1 was not used for an Ohio highway again until 1961. After planning had been completed for the Ohio Turnpike and construction of the Turnpike was substantially underway, Ohio highway authorities began planning a second Ohio Turnpike extending southwest to northeast across the state. It was planned to run from Cincinnati to Conneaut and connect with an extension built across the panhandle of Pennsylvania to the New York State Thruway.  As the highway was being planned, the Federal Aid Highway Act of 1956 was enacted, and the project was converted from a toll road to a free Interstate Highway. It was designated as SR 1, since the Interstate Highway numbering system had not yet been implemented.  Portions of the freeway began to be completed and opened in 1959 with the new Interstate Highway funding, and they were later marked as SR 1 (the Interstate Highway numbers did not go up until 1962). Since large gaps existed along the corridor where no freeway had yet been completed, existing two-lane or four-lane highways were designated as Temporary SR 1 in order to complete the route.

SR 1 was rerouted as sections of Interstate opened.

The SR 1 signage was removed in 1965 as the Interstate Highway numbers adequately marked the route and the state highway numbering was superfluous. The present day route of what was once planned as SR 1 is Interstate 71 from Cincinnati to just northeast of Medina, Interstate 271 for its entire length from northeast of Medina to Willoughby Hills, and Interstate 90 from Willoughby Hills to the Pennsylvania state line at Conneaut.

Since 1965, there has been no highway designated as SR 1.

Route description (1961)
In 1961, SR 1 followed Central Ave. in Cincinnati, to John Street, to Lincoln Park Drive (now Ezzard Charles Drive), to Freeman Avenue, to Western Avenue, to Spring Grove Avenue, to Colerain Avenue to Interstate 75 (at what is now the I-75/I-74 interchange); Interstate 75 from current I-74 interchange to West Carrollton; U.S. Route 25 (Dixie Drive) from West Carrollton to Interstate 70; Interstate 70 from Dixie Drive to near Enon (the current I-70/SR 4 split); State Route 4 from near Enon to Springfield; U.S. Route 40 from Springfield to Columbus; Broad St. (US 40) in Columbus, to 4th Street, to Summit/3rd Street (US 23), to Hudson Street, to Interstate 71; I-71 from Columbus to just east of Medina (the only portion of Interstate 71 complete at the time); State Route 18 from near Medina to Montrose; U.S. Route 21 from Montrose to Brecksville; State Route 82 from Brecksville to Aurora; (an alternate SR 1 ran from Twinsburg southeast along State Route 14 to Streetsboro and then on State Route 43 to Aurora, in order to connect SR 1 to the Ohio Turnpike;) State Route 306 from Aurora to State Route 84; SR 84 from State Route 306 to just west of what was then State Route 44; due south to Interstate 90 along what is now a section of SR 44; and finally Interstate 90 to the Pennsylvania state line.

Major intersections (1964)

References

External links

001